HSwMS Karlstad (K35)  was the fifth ship of the .

Design and description 

HSwMS Karlstad is the fifth ship of the s. It was built by Kockums at the Karlskrona naval base, and was the first of four vessels of the class which are designed for coastal warfare.

The hull of the vessel is made of carbon fiber reinforced plastic, a stealth technology, in order to make the vessel difficult to detect by other forces. A minimum of external equipment is stored outside of the vessel, with equipment such as liferafts being stored inside the hull. This hull also reduces the weight of the vessel by around half. It was intended to be radar silent until it moves within  of an enemy vessel, resulting in designer John Nillson saying of it, "Naval officers fall in love with [this] ship. It's not classically beautiful. In fact it looks like a lunchbox. But it has better maneuverability and can achieve that level of stealth."

Construction and career
Karlstad was built at Kockums in Gothenburg and was launched on 24 August 2006 and commissioned on 16 September 2015.

References

External links

Visby-class corvettes
Ships built in Gothenburg
2005 ships